Gobbler's Knob may refer to:

 The home of Punxsutawney Phil, the groundhog who is the central figure in Punxsutawney, Pennsylvania's annual Groundhog Day celebration.
 Gobbler's Knob Fire Lookout, a fire lookout tower in Mount Rainier National Park in Washington, USA.
 Gobblers Knob (Utah), a Wasatch Range summit near Salt Lake City, Utah